Cape Casey is a conspicuous cape surmounted by a peak  high, marking the east end of the peninsula projecting into Cabinet Inlet immediately south of Bevin Glacier, on the east coast of Graham Land. It was charted by the Falkland Islands Dependencies Survey (FIDS) and photographed from the air by the Ronne Antarctic Research Expedition in 1947. It was named by the FIDS for Rt. Hon. Richard G. Casey, Minister of State and Australian member of the British War Cabinet.

References
 

Headlands of Graham Land
Foyn Coast